Lee Moore (born August 9, 1995) is an American professional basketball player for Anwil Włocławek of the Polish Basketball League. He played college basketball at Wallace State Community College and the University of Texas at El Paso before playing professionally in Italy and Germany.

College career
After suiting up for North Cobb High School in Kennesaw, Georgia, Moore spent his freshman and sophomore seasons (2013-14, 2014-15) at Wallace State Community College in Hanceville, Alabama. He transferred to the University of Texas at El Paso for his junior year. In his single season at UTEP (2015-16), Moore led the Miners in scoring at 15.4 points per contest, while pulling down 5.4 rebounds, dishing out 3.5 assists and snagging 1.4 steals a game. In April 2016, he announced his decision to skip his senior year and turn pro.

Professional career
On September 14, 2016, Moore started his professional career in Italy, signing with Germani Basket Brescia of the country’s highest-tier league Lega Basket Serie A. He made 30 appearances for Brescia in his 2016-17 rookie season, averaging 13.0 points (season-high 26 points), 5.2 rebounds and 2.1 assists per game. Moore led Brescia to the 2018 Italian Cup Final, where they eventually lost to Fiat Torino.

On December 17, 2017, Moore recorded a career-high 28 points, shooting 8-of-12 from the field, along with five rebounds and six assists in a 90–71 win over Reyer Venezia. He finished his second season with Brescia averaging 9.5 points, 4.1 rebounds and 1.4 assists per game.

On September 13, 2018, Moore signed with Mitteldeutscher BC of the German Basketball Bundesliga (BBL). In 32 games played for Mitteldeutscher, he averaged 10.6 points, 4.4 rebounds, 2.6 assists and 1.2 steals per game.

On August 28, 2019, Moore signed a one-year deal with Maccabi Hod HaSharon of the Israeli National League, replacing Chad Frazier. On October 24, 2019, he parted ways with Hod HaSharon before appearing in a game for them.

Moore played for Atenas in the Argentine league and averaged 11.6 points and 4.6 rebounds per game. He signed with MKS Dąbrowa Górnicza of the Polish Basketball League (PLK) on March 6, 2020. On July 6, 2021, he returned to Germani Basket Brescia.

On August 6, 2022, he has signed with Rawlplug Sokół Łańcut of the PLK.

On October 28, 2022, he has signed with Anwil Włocławek of the Polish Basketball League.

References

External links 
 Legabasket profile
 UTEP bio
 RealGM profile
 Eurobasket.com profile

1995 births
Living people
American expatriate basketball people in Germany
American expatriate basketball people in Italy
American expatriate basketball people in Argentina
American expatriate basketball people in Poland
American men's basketball players
Basketball players from Marietta, Georgia
Basket Brescia Leonessa players
Junior college men's basketball players in the United States
KK Włocławek players
Mitteldeutscher BC players
MKS Dąbrowa Górnicza (basketball) players
Shooting guards
UTEP Miners men's basketball players
Wallace State Lions men's basketball players